Druid Hill or Druid Hills can refer to several places in the United States:

Druid Hills, Georgia, a neighborhood and census-designated place (CDP) in DeKalb County, partly in the city of Atlanta and partly unincorporated
Druid Hills High School, in DeKalb County
Druid Hills Road, in DeKalb County
North Druid Hills, Georgia, a census-designated place (CDP) in unincorporated DeKalb County
Druid Hills, Kentucky
Druid Hill Park in Baltimore, Maryland
Druid Hills, a historic neighborhood in Hendersonville, North Carolina